Charles Jean Baptiste Grisart (29 September 1837, in Paris – 11 March 1904, in Compiègne) was a French operatic composer.

Operas
La Quenouille de verre (1873) 
Les Trois Margots (1877) 
Le Pont d'Avignon (1878) 
Le Petit abbé (1879)
Les Poupées de l'Infante (1881) 
Le Bossu (1888) 
Le Petit Bois (1893) 
Voilà le roi! (1894)

External links
Opera, Stanford

French opera composers
Male opera composers
French male classical composers
1837 births
1904 deaths
19th-century French male musicians